Rumbadoodle is the debut studio album from Arun Shenoy. It was recorded across the world over the period of two years and was released on August 30, 2012.  The album was nominated for a Grammy Award in the Best Instrumental Pop album category in February 2013.

The album consists of 11 songs, which are individually named by a wide range of styles that are integrated into every song. Shenoy contributes all the proceeds from the album to an education fund for underprivileged people in India.

Composition
The album has a flamenco feel with fusion influences drawn from contemporary pop, rock and jazz. While he himself claims to have more of a rock and roll background, he was fascinated by Flamenco from a young age, which drove him to try something unfamiliar. Shenoy has cited Yanni as a major inspiration for the album.

Track listing

Production and personnel
The Art Directors of the album included Roshni Mohapatra, who is also Shenoy’s wife.

 Arun Shenoy - Album Artist, Arranger, Art Direction, Composer, Engineer, Liner Notes, Producer
 Ian Cameron - Composer, Violin
 Robert Capria - Art Direction, Artwork
 Jerry Chua - Drums, Mixing, Mastering
 Owen Gurry - Composer, Guitar (Electric), String Arrangements
 Shamoon Khatri - Keyboards

 Roshni Mohpatra - Art Direction, Artwork, Liner Notes, Photography
 Lonnie Park - Composer, Keyboards, Piano
 Ramil Duke Purisima - Arranger, Bass, Composer, Engineer, Percussion
 Edward Roth - Composer, Organ, Piano
 Glenn Sharp – Composer, Guitar (Flamenco)
 Jonathan Wesley – Composer, Keyboards, Piano Arrangement, String Arrangements

Charts

See also
 Arun Shenoy

References

2012 albums
Instrumental albums